Mirian Tsalkalamanidze (Georgian: მირიან ცალქალამანიძე, 20 April 1927 – 3 August 2000) was a Georgian flyweight freestyle wrestler. He competed for the Soviet Union at the 1956 Olympics and won a gold medal in the 52 kg division. At the world championships he placed third in 1954 and second in 1957.

Tsalkalamanidze initially trained in chidaoba, the Georgian traditional wrestling, and changed to freestyle wrestling only in 1951, aged 24. He won the Soviet freestyle championships in 1954 in 1956, placing third in 1955.

References

1927 births
2000 deaths
People from Kakheti
Olympic wrestlers of the Soviet Union
Wrestlers at the 1956 Summer Olympics
Male sport wrestlers from Georgia (country)
Soviet male sport wrestlers
Olympic gold medalists for the Soviet Union
Olympic medalists in wrestling
Medalists at the 1956 Summer Olympics
World Wrestling Championships medalists
Spartak athletes